Johann Joseph Gassner (22 August 1727 in Braz, near Bludenz, Vorarlberg – 1779 Pondorf, now part of Winklarn, Bavaria) was a noted exorcist. 

While a Catholic priest at Klösterle he gained a wide celebrity by professing to "cast out devils" and to work cures on the sick by means simply of prayer; he was attacked as an impostor, but the bishop of Regensburg, who believed in his honesty, bestowed upon him the cure of Pondorf. 

Gassner's methods have been linked to a special form of hypnotic training. He has been described as a predecessor of modern hypnosis.  Henri Ellenberger, in his "Discovery of the Unconscious", placed the dispute between Gassner and Franz Anton Mesmer at the center of modern psychotherapy.

References

Midelfort, H. C. Erik. Exorcism and Enlightenment: Johann Joseph Gassner and the demons of eighteenth-century Germany (New Haven: Yale University Press, 2005). .
Gassner at the Catholic Encyclopedia
Gassner biography (German)

1727 births
1779 deaths
People from Bludenz District
18th-century Austrian Roman Catholic priests